Korak do slobode (trans. One Step to Freedom) is the seventh studio album from Serbian and former Yugoslav rock band Galija. It is the second part of the trilogy consisting of the album Daleko je Sunce, this album and the album Istorija, ti i ja. It is the second album recorded in cooperation with lyricist Radomir Kanjevac.

The song "Kad me pogledaš" is a cover of Dire Straits song "Brothers in Arms". The song "Sloboda" is a duet by Galija frontman Nenad Milosavljević and Goran Šepa, the singer of the hard rock band Kerber. Reggae-inspired "Ljubavna pesma" lyrics deal with growing nationalism in Yugoslavia.

Track listing
"Noć" (N. Milosavljević, R. Kanjevac) – 3:54
"Korak do slobode" (N. Milosavljević, R. Kanjevac) – 2:50
"Na tvojim usnama" (B. Zlatković, R. Kanjevac) – 3:10
"Kopaonik" (B. Zlatković, R. Kanjevac) – 2:45
"Kad me pogledaš" (M. Knopfler, N. Milosavljević, R. Kanjevac) - 4:45
"Sloboda" (B. Zlatković, R. Kanjevac) – 3:30
"Pevaju jutra" (N. Milosavljević, J. J. Roscam, P. Milosavljević, R. Kanjevac) – 3:15
"Ljubavna pesma" (J. J. Roscam, R. Kanjevac) – 2:30
"Nasmeši se" (B. Zlatković, R. Kanjevac) – 3:48

Personnel
Nenad Milosavljević - vocals
Predrag Milosavljević - vocals
Jean Jacques Roscam - guitar
Bata Zlatković - flute
Predrag Milanović - bass guitar
Boban Pavlović - drums

Guest musicians
Goran Šepa - vocals
Boban Marković - trumpet

Legacy
In 2015 Korak do slobode album cover was ranked 78th on the list of 100 Greatest Album Covers of Yugoslav Rock published by web magazine Balkanrock.

References 

 EX YU ROCK enciklopedija 1960-2006,  Janjatović Petar;  

Galija albums
1989 albums
PGP-RTB albums
Concept albums